Thomas Börje Forsberg (17 February 1966 – 3 June 2004), better known by the stage name Quorthon, was a Swedish musician. He was one of the founders, as well as the sole songwriter, of the band Bathory, which pioneered the black metal genre and is credited with creating the Viking metal style. A multi-instrumentalist, Quorthon wrote the music and lyrics on all of Bathory's albums and performed vocals and guitars.

Career 

Quorthon formed Bathory in 1983 when he was 17 years old, after briefly playing in the Oi! band Stridskuk, which also featured drummer Johan "Jolle" Elvén and bass player Rickard "Ribban" Bergman, who later played on early Bathory demos and in the case of Bergman, albums. He recorded his early albums together with the help of his father Börje Forsberg who was also the head of the Swedish record label Tyfon Grammofon that would go on to release most of Bathory's albums through the subsidiary Black Mark Production. The first album was recorded in the garage of schlager writer Peter Himmelstrand, dubbed Studio Heavenshore.

During the mid-to-late 1980s, live performances by Bathory were rare. Albums from this period contributed to the then-burgeoning black metal subgenre, and rare photographs of the band helped in part to define its image. Beginning in the 1990s, Quorthon took full control of Bathory, choosing to forgo performing live in order to spend time recording music with hired musicians, as well changing style from the black metal of the 1980s to a slower, heavier style which eventually became the founding of the Viking metal genre, due to its lyrics being focused on Norse mythology. From this point onward, he also played bass guitar on almost all of his albums, and mostly used a drum machine or a session drummer.

Quorthon also personally paid for the production of Bathory's only music video, for the song "One Rode to Asa Bay", taken from their fifth studio album, Hammerheart. The video was shown on MTV's Headbangers Ball, though Quorthon had not yet seen it at the time he was interviewed for the program.

In 1993 Quorthon set Bathory aside and recorded and released two albums under the name "Quorthon". The first, called Album, was released in 1994. The final two solo releases emerged in 1997, Purity of Essence and the EP When Our Day Is Through. The albums released under the Quorthon moniker were more rock-oriented than Bathory's black/Viking metal style. While working on these albums he found new inspiration to continue composing music for Bathory. Bathory's next albums were in a retro-thrash metal style, before he veered towards his Viking metal style once again, especially on the Nordland saga.

Death 
On 3 June 2004, Quorthon was found dead in his apartment in Stockholm. The cause of his death was a congenital heart defect. He was 38 years old.

Discography

As Bathory 

 Bathory (1984)
 The Return…… (1985)
 Under the Sign of the Black Mark (1987)
 Blood Fire Death (1988)
 Hammerheart (1990)
 Twilight of the Gods (1991)
 Jubileum Volume I (1992)
 Jubileum Volume II (1993)
 Requiem (1994)
 Octagon (1995)
 Blood on Ice (1996)
 Jubileum Volume III (1998)
 Destroyer of Worlds (2001)
 Nordland I (2002)
 Nordland II (2003)

As Quorthon 
 Album (1994)
 When Our Day Is Through EP (1997)
 Purity of Essence (1997)

References

External links

1966 births
2004 deaths
20th-century Swedish male singers
Black metal singers
Black metal musicians
Singers from Stockholm
Swedish heavy metal singers
Swedish multi-instrumentalists
Burials at Skogskyrkogården
Black Mark Production artists